

The Prashansaniya Seva Vibhushanaya (PSV, Commendable Service Order) (Sinhala: ප්‍රසංශනීය සේවා විභූෂණය prasanṣanīya sēvā vibhūṣaṇaya) is a military decoration awarded to officers of the Sri Lanka Volunteer Naval Force in recognition of excellent service. Inaugurated on 31 January 2000, the medal does not confer any individual precedence. It is equivalent to the Reserve Decoration of the Royal Navy.

Award process
All commissioned officers of the SLNVF are eligible for this award, provided they have completed 18 years of "long, meritorious, loyal, valuable, service and unblemished conduct" by or after 22 May 1972.

Recipients are entitled to use the post-nominal letters "PSV".

References

External links
Sri Lanka Navy
Ministry of Defence : Sri Lanka

Military awards and decorations of Sri Lanka
Awards established in 2000